Sidi Allal El Bahraoui is a town in Khémisset Province, Rabat-Salé-Kénitra, Morocco. According to the 2004 census it has a population of 9,884.

References

Municipalities of Morocco